Samuel Jessurun de Mesquita (6 June 1868 –  11 February 1944) was a Dutch graphic artist active in the years before the Second World War. His pupils included graphic artist M. C. Escher (1898–1972). A Sephardic Jew, in his old age he was sent to Auschwitz by the Nazis, where he was gassed along with his wife. After the war, de Mesquita was largely forgotten.

Early life and education 
Samuel Jessurun de Mesquita was born on 6 June 1868 into a Jewish family living in Amsterdam. Though a member of a tightly knit Sephardic community, a minority among Dutch Jews, de Mesquita, like most of his contemporaries, was not religiously observant. His father, a secondary school teacher of Hebrew and German, died when Sam or Sampie, as he was called, was five.

At the age of fourteen, the young de Mesquita applied to the Rijksakademie in pursuit of his artistic interests, only to be rejected. Deeply disappointed, he apprenticed himself to an acting city architect, for whom he worked for two years before entering a technical school with the intention of becoming an architect himself. He soon turned, however, to the pedagogy and, in 1889, received a teacher's certificate, which would later enable him to support his family.

Career 

Over the next years, de Mesquita principally devoted himself to art, experimenting with various techniques and mediums. Though known primarily for his wood engravings, he also produced etchings, lithographs, watercolors and drawings; his applied art consisted mostly of material designs. There are birds, exotic animals, plants and flowers, and fantastical representations, both humorous and grim. Among de Mesquita's most beautiful works are his portraits, particularly his self-portraits.

de Mesquita's work was included in the 1939 exhibition and sale Onze Kunst van Heden (Our Art of Today) at the Rijksmuseum in Amsterdam.

With Nazi Germany's invasion of the Netherlands in May 1940, de Mesquita, already in poor health, was forced to lead a secluded life, limiting his work largely to sketches.

Covers for Wendingen

Death 
In the winter of 1944, on either 31 January or 1 February, the occupying German forces entered the home of the de Mesquita family in Watergraafsmeer, now part of Amsterdam, and apprehended him, his wife Elisabeth, and their only son Jaap. Transported to Auschwitz, Samuel Jessurun and Elisabeth were sent to the gas chambers within days of their arrival on 11 February; Jaap perished in the concentration camp at Theresienstadt on 20 March.  Escher and some of Jaap’s friends were successful in rescuing some of the works that had remained in the de Mesquita home.

References 

 Thomas Hengstenberg (Hrsg.): Samuel Jessurun de Mesquita: Von der Linie zur Fläche., Text dt. und engl., Bönen: Kettler, 2011. .

External links 
 
 Samuel Jessurun de Mesquita Collections on The Met

1868 births
1944 deaths
Artists from Amsterdam
Dutch artists
Dutch Sephardi Jews
Dutch civilians killed in World War II
Dutch Jews who died in the Holocaust
Dutch people who died in Auschwitz concentration camp
People killed by gas chamber by Nazi Germany
Sephardi Jews who died in the Holocaust